My Jesus (Live in Nashville) is the debut extended play (EP) by American contemporary Christian music singer Anne Wilson, which was released via Capitol Christian Music Group on August 6, 2021. Jeff Pardo handled the production of the EP.

The EP peaked at number twelve on the Top Christian Albums chart in the United States.

Background
On June 18, 2021, Anne Wilson announced that she will release My Jesus (Live in Nashville) on August 6, 2021, a live extended play supporting the multi-track single "My Jesus" released in April 2021. The EP was recorded live at the White Dove Barn in Nashville, Tennessee, and contains five tracks and includes the three songs previously released by Wilson on the multi-track single as well as a new song, "No Place Like Home," and a cover of Little Big Town's "Boondocks." Wilson shared the story behind the EP, saying:

Reception

Critical response

Joshua Andre in his 365 Days of Inspiring Media review, applauded Wilson for the EP, saying: "we are met with a vibrant, emotive, personal and honest batch of songs, where Anne delivers her already previously released three singles with intense passion, as well as an all-new track "No Place Like Home" and a cover of Little Big Town's "Boondocks"." Mercedes Rich, indicating in a favourable review at Today's Christian Entertainment, said: "This whole EP goes to show that Christian music can expand through many genres and still worship God. This whole extended play lets Anne Wilson’s personality shine through in her music."

Accolades

Commercial performance
In the United States, My Jesus (Live in Nashville) debuted at number seventeen on the Billboard's Top Christian Albums Chart dated August 21, 2021.

Track listing

Personnel
Adapted from AllMusic.
 Jacob Arnold — drums
 Josh Bailey — A&R
 Rich Brinsfield — bass
 Court Clement — electric guitar
 Alex Dobbert — mastering
 Nathan Dugger — acoustic guitar 
 Jason Eskridge — background vocals
 Ainslie Grosser — editing, mixing, recording
 Dwan Hill — keyboards
 Jeff Pardo — producer
 Kiely Phillips — background vocals 
 Matt Podesla — electric guitar
 Sarah Lindsay Pogue — A&R
 Anne Wilson — primary artist, vocals

Charts

Weekly charts

Year-end charts

Release history

References

2021 EPs